David Mathews (born 25 May 1977) is a retired English field hockey player.

He was part of the England squad that competed at the 2002 Commonwealth Games.

He now teaches at Gordon’s School.

He has played club hockey for Canterbury, Holcombe and Sutton Valence. He also spent time in Netherlands playing for Amsterdam.

References

1977 births
Living people
English male field hockey players
Holcombe Hockey Club players
Field hockey players at the 2002 Commonwealth Games
Commonwealth Games competitors for England
2002 Men's Hockey World Cup players